Attorney General Bailey may refer to:

 Andrew Bailey (politician) (born 1981), Attorney General of Missouri
Carl E. Bailey (1894–1948), Attorney General of Arkansas
William Henry Bailey (1831–1908), Attorney General of North Carolina

See also
Douglas Baily (born 1937), Attorney General of Alaska
General Bailey (disambiguation)